Surp Yerrortutyun Armenian Church, is an Armenian Catholic Church located in Beyoğlu Municipality, Istanbul, Turkey. The church was built at the very beginning of the 18th century by four Austrian priests. It burned in 1762 after the reconstruction, it was struck by fire again in 1831 and was rebuilt in 1836. The Church was purchased on May 25, 1857, by Armenian Catholics.

The Turkish name of this temple is Surp Hovhan Vosgeperan Ermeni Katolik Kilisesi, because is it an Armenian church that belongs to the Catholic Roman Church, as opposed to the majority of the Armenian churches in the world, that are part of the Armenian Apostolic Church.

Vosgeperan means Golden Mouthed in Armenian. This church is dedicated to Saint John Chrysostom, He was Archbishop of Constantinople (the original name of Istanbul), and he is considered an Early Church Father. He was a very notable preacher, famous for his eloquence and his many writings. (Hence the term Golden Mouthed).

This church is located a few steps away from Taksim Square and the famous pedestrian boulevard Istiklal Caddesi. If you are not looking for it, you may miss it, since it is located behind a tall wall in a narrow street. Both the outer wall and the walls of the church are pink.

Vosgeperan is not a very ornate or luxurious temple. It is rather simple and elegant, with many elements made of marble, gold and wood. The lamps, the altar and the pulpit are beautiful. When you are inside, the quiet atmosphere invites prayer and meditation.

References 

Armenian Catholic churches in Turkey
Catholic churches in Istanbul
Beyoğlu
19th-century Roman Catholic church buildings in Turkey